Dendronotus comteti is a species of sea slug, a dendronotid nudibranch, a shell-less marine gastropod mollusc in the family Dendronotidae.

Distribution 
This species was described from specimens collected from near hydrothermal vents by the submersible Nautile at the Lucky Strike area of the Mid-Atlantic ridge at 1685 m depth.

References

Dendronotidae
Gastropods described in 1998
Molluscs of the Atlantic Ocean